Toyda is a rural locality (a settlement) in Oktyabrskoye Rural Settlement, Paninsky District, Voronezh Oblast, Russia. The population was 277 as of 2010. There are 4 streets.

Geography 
Toyda is located 10 km southeast of Panino (the district's administrative centre) by road. Timiryazevsky is the nearest rural locality.

References 

Rural localities in Paninsky District